The automotive industry in Egypt has been developing for 50 years. It can sell more than 200,000 vehicles annually and is now the second-largest market in Africa and the 42nd largest in the world, with an annual production output of over 70,000 vehicles. After experiencing many failures and success, the Egyptian Automotive industry is focusing more on assembly operations rather than manufacturing.

Evolution of the automotive industry

1960s 
The automotive industry in Egypt started in 1961, when the Egypt government founded the first automobile company called EI Nasr Automotive Manufacturing Company. It was the first Arab vehicle manufacturer and it was state-owned. The company mainly produced the Fiat-based vehicle due to the engineering and design problems and the company also assembled foreign licensed cars under its brand. After years of development, they came up with their own products, such as Nasr 128 GLS, which was the best-selling model at that time.

The Open-Door Policy 
In 1974, President Sadat of Egypt initiated an Open Door Economic Policy (ODEP). Many foreign companies and capital entered Egypt automobile market in the 1980s. In 1985, the General Motors (GM) started a joint venture with Al-Monsour Automotive Company which was a local importer and car dealer in Egypt. At the beginning of the 1990s, the Egypt government adopted the Economic Reform and Structural Adjustment Program (ERSAP). It attracted many foreign companies entered the Egypt market to build their factories and assembly lines. There were many big companies such as Citroen, Fiat, Hyundai, Mercedes-Benz, Nissan, BMW and so on.

January 25 revolution 
In 2010, the vehicle production increased to 116,683. It was the best time for the Egyptian automotive industry. However, the Egyptian revolution of 2011, also known as the January 25 revolution, which deposed former president Hosni Mubarak, caused significant harm to the industry. Nissan suspended its production in Egypt for safety reasons after the government protests started, Toyota stopped their SUV assembly business in Egypt due to the situation, many Korean companies such as Samsung, LG, and Hyundai Motors had to give up their business in Egypt due to the country-wide protesting and many employees were forced to return to Korea or a different country, BMW returned German nationals to Germany because of the violent demonstrations, and other automotive manufacturers like Daimler AG and General Motors had temporarily suspended operations in Egypt. Due to the political changes, the production rate went down 30% in 2011 and remained down in the next few years. The total car production, as of 2017, is only 36,640.

Domestic automotive industry   
The automotive industry is one of the most important industries in Egypt and brings many benefits for the economy. In the 1980s, EI Nasr Automotive Manufacturing Company was the only giant manufacturer in the whole Egypt market. There are now 83 car-manufacturers in Egypt. It  has giants like GM, BMW, Hyundai, Toyota and Nissan produce their main product line in Egypt's factories. There are more than 15 car assembly factories and 75 facilities in the country providing more than 75,000 job opportunities. It has the capacity to produce 300,000 passenger cars, light commercial vehicles, trucks, and buses per year. Especially, It is an under-penetrated automobile market with large numbers of young population. The demand is increasing every year and has big potential. There is only an average of 35 Egyptians owning a car out of every 1000. The number in Algeria is 130 out of 1000 which is four times larger than Egypt.

However, the Egyptian pound cause the negative impact to imports of car parts due to its weakening. It made the assembly parts more expensive and cause the substantial impact on the vehicles' selling price and the cost of production and subsequently. It is difficult for domestic producers to compete with European exporters and large-scale Asian due to the small market. At the end, the existing assemblers will look for companies that have high sales volume in the country.

The Egypt government has signed the Tripartite Free Trade Agreement which allows free trade in 26 countries of the Common Market for Eastern and Southern Africa(COMESA). It provides opportunities for Egyptian exports. The economy of Africa is increasing and the car demand is booming across the board.

Car manufacturers in Egypt 
1. Al Fotouh Car Assembly Company 

2. Arab American Vehicles

A joint venture between the Arab Organization for Industrialization (51%) and the Chrysler Group LLC (49%). Producing military and civilian vehicles.

3. El-Tramco

4. General Motors Egypt S.A.E 

A joint venture between world leader, General Motors International, and the local importer and car dealer Al-Mansour Automotive Company. The factory is located in the 6th of October City.

5. Ghabbour Group

Founded in 1940, the Ghabbour Group is the largest car manufacturer in Egypt producing 150,000 units annually. The company manufactures cars for Bajaj Auto, Hyundai and Volvo.

6. JAC Motor

JAC Motor is state-owned car manufacturer. The company was founded in 1964 and was listed on the Shanghai Stock Exchange in 2001.

7. Mercedes Egypt

Established as a wholly owned subsidiary of Daimler AG in December 1999. Assembling for the Mercedes Benz vehicles.

8. Suzuki Egypt

Assembles for Suzuki passenger vehicles. 

9. Wagih Abaza Company

Assembling for the Peugeot 405.

10. The Bavarian Auto Group

Manufactures and sells BMW vehicles. It was founded by BMW in March 2003 and is located in the 6th of October City.

11. Speranza Motors, Ltd

An Egyptian auto manufacturer based in Maadi, Cairo It is a part of the Daewoo Motor Egypt (DME) which itself belongs to the Aboul Fotouh Group. The factory is located in the 6th October City.

12. The Seoudi Group

An Egyptian automobile manufacturer which was founded in 1975. The company manufactures Nissan Vehicles located in the Thai Trade Center

13. Egyptian German Automotive Company

An Egyptian car assembler, which was founded by former Daimler-Benz CEO and Samy Saad as a joint venture to assemble vehicles of the Mercedes-Benz brand. It is located in the 6th October City assembling Mercedes Benz vehicles.

14. El Nasr Automotive Manufacturing Company

It was the first Arab vehicle manufacturer and it was state-owned. The company mainly produced the Fiat-based vehicle due to the engineering and designed problems and the company also assembled foreign licensed cars under its brand.

15. MCV Bus and Coach

A bus bodies manufacturer, founded in 2002.

16. Egy-Tech Engineering

A three-wheeled vehicles manufacturer.

17. Manufacturing Commercial Vehicles

An Egyptian company manufacturing buses and trucks. The factory is located in Salheya.

18. Gorika Egypt

19. Nissan Motor Egypt

Egypt automobile market 
The Egypt automotive market is now focusing on the customer experience and provides many opportunities for some parts. Geographical diversification model is one of the most important strategies for automobile manufacturers to keep competitive and profitable. All the giant companies in Egypt are focusing on auto-drive technology. The government encourages the development of the automobile industry. However, it is expensive to invest in environmental pollution regulation.

Production 
As a 100 million population country, the production that only average less than 10,000 per year is unable to keep up with the demand. The production in South Africa is ten times larger than in Egypt and the production in Morocco is five times larger than in Egypt. In 2002, the total number of the production car in Egypt was 45,073. In 2010, the number was increased to 116,683 and it was the best time in Egypt automobile industry. However, due to the political changes(January 25 revolution), the production went down 30% in 2011. And total production in 2017 is only 36,640. But the government has strong confidence to boost the car industry in 2018. And the market has given its feedback which the production of the total vehicle went up for 90%.

Automotive sales 
The sales of Egypt market increased 40% in the first half of 2018 compared to the half  of 2017. The best-selling year of Egypt automobile industry was 2015 which sold 349,100 new vehicles. And the total selling number of 2005 was 121,437 which is the worst-selling year. Compare to the other two major countries (South Africa and Morocco) in Africa. Egypt comes in second place in the selling market only behind South Africa and followed by Morocco and the sales market still has the capacity to growth due to the large population.

In 2017, Chevrolet was the best-selling brand in the Egypt accounting 22.3% of the automobile market. Chevrolet sold 21,468 cars and it is a 34.7% decrease in its sales compared to 2016 which sold 32,890 cars. Nissan was ranked number two and sold 15,847 vehicles in the first nine months of 2017. It was 16.5% of total marketing sales. Hyundai won third place with 14.1% of total marketing sales and sold 13,613 vehicles. Toyota came next sold 7,930 cars and won 8.2% of market share. Mitsubishi was in fifth place with 5% of total sales during 2017 and sold 4804 cars. Chery came in next at sixth position with 4.6% of the market share and sold 4419 vehicles.

References 

Economy of Egypt
E